Kenneth O. Rosenberg (January 15, 1920 – February 1, 2016) was an American politician in the state of Washington. He served in the Washington House of Representatives from 1951 to 1967 for district 5. He lives in Addy, Washington.

References

1920 births
2016 deaths
Democratic Party members of the Washington House of Representatives